Forêts National Park is a French national park located in the northeastern part of metropolitan France, not far from Dijon to the north. It protects the broad-leaved trees typical of the southeastern Paris Basin plateau.

History

The idea for the park was put forth in 2009; numerous working groups and studies were involved over a decade in identifying strengths and weaknesses for what it could accomplish, as well as otherwise developing and defining its boundaries so that it would be a coherent, sensible whole.

The park was formally established on 7 November 2019, by publication of an official decree signed by Prime Minister Édouard Philippe in the Journal Officiel de la République Française. It is the eleventh national park of France to be created and the second largest behind the Amazonian Park of Guiana in South America. Like a number of overseas areas, French Guiana is defined to be a department and region. Its park is officially the largest in the European Union.

Geography
It is the sole national park in both Grand Est and Bourgogne-Franche-Comté.

References

Protected areas established in 2019
2019 establishments in France